Camacinia othello is a species of dragonfly in the family Libellulidae 
known commonly as the black knight. It is native to Indonesia, Papua New Guinea, the Solomon Islands, and the Northern Territory and Queensland in Australia.

It is a large dragonfly with a wingspan of 115 millimeters and an overall length of around 65 millimeters The adult male has dark markings on the forewing and hindwing covering around one third to one half of each wing. The markings on the female differ substantially, with a light brown stripe along the leading edge of each wing to just beyond the node, and light brown marks on each wingtip.

Little is known about its habitat preferences and other characteristics. There are twenty-seven records listed in the Atlas of Living Australia as of January, 2017. It is not considered to be threatened.

Gallery

References

Libellulidae
Odonata of Asia
Odonata of Australia
Insects of Asia
Insects of Australia
Taxa named by Robert John Tillyard
Insects described in 1908